Cyril IV may refer to:

Pope Cyril IV of Alexandria
Patriarch Cyril IV of Constantinople